Znamensk is a rural locality (a settlement) in Gvardeysky District of Kaliningrad Oblast, Russia, located on the right bank of the Pregolya River at its confluence with the Lava River  east of Kaliningrad. Population figures:

History

The site of today's Znamensk was originally an Old Prussian fort, with a settlement named Velowe nearby. The site featured an unusually large oak tree, considered sacred by the local Prussians.  It survived at least until 1595, when it was mentioned by Caspar Hennenberger.

Around 1255 the locality was fortified, but the castle was surrendered to the Teutonic Knights by its mayor, Tirslo. The Teutons continued to use the castle and began to colonize the region with Germans, giving the settlement the name Wehlau. It received its civic charter in 1335 and in 1339 and became a centre for horse stables and horse trade. Until the late 19th century the town was allowed to organise a six-day linen fair, a three-day horse fair and two additional horse and cattle fairs every year. In 1349 Grand Master of the Teutonic Order Heinrich Dusemer founded a Franciscan Monastery there to commemorate his victory over the Prussians in the battle of Streba River. In 1380 the St. Jacob's church was erected.

Since 1440, the town was a founding member of the Prussian Confederation, which opposed Teutonic rule. In 1454, the Confederation asked Polish King Casimir IV Jagiellon to incorporate the region into the Kingdom of Poland, to which the King agreed and signed the act of incorporation in Kraków, and the castle and the city joined the Kingdom of Poland. During the subsequent Thirteen Years' War, in 1460 the Teutonic Order besieged the town and successfully retook it. The war ended in 1466 with a peace treaty signed in Toruń, according to which the town became a part of Poland as a fief held by the Teutonic Knights. In 1490 Grand Master Johann von Tiefen restored (or founded, the sources are unclear) another Franciscan monastery in the town. However, it was destroyed in 1519 in the course of Protestant Reformation, when the burghers converted to Protestantism and decided that such a small town is not able to bear the burden of sustaining two monasteries.

In 1540 the town was destroyed by a large fire and only the St. Jacob's church was left standing. Wehlau was successfully rebuilt, although natural disasters struck it repeatedly, notably in 1542 and 1593. The town finally recovered and by the end of 16th century Margrave Georg Friedrich considered moving the University of Königsberg to Wehlau, which however never materialised. In the Treaty of Wehlau signed in the town in 1657, Frederick William, Elector of Brandenburg, received sovereignty over the Duchy of Prussia.

In 1818, it became the seat of Landkreis Wehlau in East Prussia within the Kingdom of Prussia. In 1871 Wehlau joined the German Empire. By the end of the 19th century the town had roughly 4000 inhabitants, mostly German Lutherans. The town had a station of the Prussian Eastern Railway connecting Königsberg and Berlin to the Saint Petersburg–Warsaw Railway, as well as a Lutheran church, a regional courthouse and a school.

Near the end of World War II, on 23 January 1945, the town was taken by troops of the 3rd Belorussian Front of the Red Army. The old town center was almost completely destroyed, and the German population fled during the evacuation of East Prussia or expelled. It became part of the Kaliningrad Oblast and was renamed Znamensk, losing its civic rights in the process. It was demoted to a rural settlement in 2006.

Notable people
 George von Kunheim (1523–1611) married Margaretha Luther, grandchild of Martin Luther in 1555.
 Johann Christoph Strodtmann (1717–1756) a German author, writing on theology, philology, classical studies, history of law and history of scholarship
 Gustav Neumann, (1838 – 1881), chess master
 Ernst Vanhöffen (1858–1918), zoologist
 David Hilbert (1862–1943), mathematician
 Walter Schütz (1897–1933), politician
 Herbert Pilch (1927–2018), linguist
 Roza Shanina (1924–1945): Soviet sniper during World War II

References

Citations

Bibliography

See also
Yasnaya Polyana, Kaliningrad Oblast

Rural localities in Kaliningrad Oblast
Gvardeysky District